Bardhaman Dakshin Assembly constituency is an assembly constituency in Purba Bardhaman district in the Indian state of West Bengal.

Overview
As per order of the Delimitation Commission, No. 260 Bardhaman Dakshin Assembly constituency covers Bardhaman municipality.

Bardhaman Dakshin assembly segment is part of No. 39 Bardhaman-Durgapur (Lok Sabha constituency).

Members of Legislative Assembly

Election results

2021

2016

2011
In the 2011 elections, Rabiranjan Chattopadhyay of Trinamool Congress defeated his nearest rival Nirupam Sen of CPI(M).

 

.# Swing calculated on Congress+Trinamool Congress vote percentages taken together, as well as the CPI(M) vote percentage, in 2006, for Bardhaman Dakshin constituency.

1967-2006
Nirupam Sen of CPI (M) won the Bardhaman Dakshin assembly seat in 2006 and 2001 state assembly elections defeating his nearest rivals Samir Kumar Roy and Paresh Chandra Sarkar (both of Trinamool Congress) in the respective years. Contests in most years were multi cornered but only winners and runners are being mentioned. In 1996 and 1991, Shyamaprosad Bose of CPI (M) defeated Sadhan Kumar Ghosh and Shyamadas Banerjee (both of Congress) in respective years. In 1987, Nirupam Sen of CPI (M) defeated Pradip Bhattacharya of Congress. In 1982 and 1977, Kaustav Roy of CPI (M) defeated Shyamadas Banerjee and Pradip Bhattacharya (both of Congress) in the respective years. Pradip Bhattacharya of Congress won the seat in 1972. Benoy Choudhury of CPI (M) won the seat in 1971 and 1969. S.B.Chowdhury of Congress won the seat in 1967.

1951-1962
Radharani Mahtab of Congress won the Bardhaman seat in 1962. Benoy Choudhuri representing CPI won the seat in 1957 and 1951.

References

Politics of Paschim Bardhaman district
Assembly constituencies of West Bengal
Politics of Purba Bardhaman district